The 1992–93 season was the 78th season of the Isthmian League, which is an English football competition featuring semi-professional and amateur clubs from London, East and South East England. League consisted of four divisions.

Premier Division

The Premier Division consisted of 22 clubs, including 19 clubs from the previous season and three clubs promoted from Division One:
 Dulwich Hamlet
 Stevenage Borough
 Yeading

No teams were promoted this year after Chesham United and St Albans City were denied due to ground grading.

League table

Division One

Division One consisted of 21 clubs, including 17 clubs from the previous season and four new clubs:
 Billericay Town, promoted as third in Division Two
 Bishop's Stortford, relegated from the Premier Division
 Lewes, promoted as runners-up in Division Two
 Purfleet, promoted as champions of Division Two

Before the start of the season Leyton-Wingate changed name to Leyton.

League table

Division Two

Division Two consisted of 22 clubs, including 18 clubs from the previous season and four clubs promoted from Division Three:
 Chertsey Town
 Edgware Town
 Hampton
 Tilbury

League table

Division Three

Division Three consisted of 21 clubs, including 16 clubs from the previous season and five new clubs:
 Aldershot Town, newly created club
 East Thurrock United, joined from the Essex Senior League
 Farnham Town, joined from the Combined Counties League
 Leighton Town, joined from the South Midlands League
 Northwood, joined from the Spartan League

Although, Farnham Town were accepted to the league, club never started the season due to ground grading problems and returned to the Combined Counties League for the 1993–94 season.

League table

See also
Isthmian League
1992–93 Northern Premier League
1992–93 Southern Football League

References

Isthmian League seasons
6